The Wadi Khnezir is a tributary of the Khabur River in northeastern Syria.

References

Khnezir
Tributaries of the Khabur (Euphrates)